The 2015 Kuurne–Brussels–Kuurne was the 67th edition of the Kuurne–Brussels–Kuurne cycling classic. It was run on 1 March 2015 and was rated as a 1.1 race as part of the 2015 UCI Europe Tour. The race was run over a  course, starting and finishing in Kuurne; despite the name, the race did not at any point enter Brussels. The race was the second race of the weekend that opened the traditional Belgian classics season following Omloop Het Nieuwsblad, held the previous day and won by Ian Stannard.

The race was won by Mark Cavendish in a sprint finish, ahead of Alexander Kristoff and Elia Viviani. Cavendish's team had split the race on the Oude Kwaremont, but the race came back together due to a strong headwind. After Philippe Gilbert made a late attack,  led the peloton in the final kilometres. Cavendish held Kristoff's wheel in the final kilometres and was able to come around him to take his second victory in the race, following his win in 2012.

Results

References

External links 

 

Kuurne–Brussels–Kuurne
Kuurne-Brussels-Kuurne
Kuurne-Brussels-Kuurne